Hyalaethea solomonis is a moth of the subfamily Arctiinae. It was described by George Hampson. It is found on the Solomon Islands.

The wingspan is about 32 mm. The forewings are hyaline with black-brown veins and margins. The base of the inner margin has some orange and there are black-brown fasciae from the cell to the termen between veins six and five and three and two. The hindwings are hyaline.

References

Arctiinae